The Modern Age of Comic Books is a period in the history of American superhero comic books which began in 1985 and continues through the present day. During approximately the first 15 years of this period, many comic book characters were redesigned, creators gained prominence in the industry, independent comics flourished, and larger publishing houses became more commercialized.

An alternative name for this period is the Dark Age of Comic Books, due to the popularity and artistic influence of titles with serious content, such as Batman: The Dark Knight Returns and Watchmen.

Developments

Because the time period encompassing the Modern Age is not well defined, and in some cases disputed by both fans and most professionals, a comprehensive history is open to debate. Many influences from the Bronze Age of Comic Books would overlap with the infancy of the Modern Age. The work of creators such as John Byrne (Alpha Flight, Fantastic Four), Chris Claremont (Iron Fist, Uncanny X-Men), and Frank Miller (Daredevil) would reach fruition in the Bronze Age but their impact was still felt in the Modern Age. The Uncanny X-Men is the most definitive example of this impact as Bronze Age characters such as Wolverine and Sabretooth would have a huge influence on the Marvel Universe in the 1980s and beyond.

For DC, Crisis on Infinite Earths is the bridge that joins the two ages. The result was the cancellation of The Flash (with issue 350), Superman (with issue 423), and Wonder Woman (with issue 329). The post-Crisis world would have Wally West as the new Flash, John Byrne writing a brand-new Superman series, and George Pérez working on a new Wonder Woman series. Batman would also get a makeover as the Batman: Year One storyline would be one of the most popular Batman stories ever published.

In rough chronological order by the beginning of the trend, here are some important developments that occurred during the Modern Age, many of which are interrelated:

Rise of independent publishers
The late 1970s saw famed creators going to work for new independent publishers. The arrival of Jim Shooter as Editor in Chief at Marvel Comics saw the departure of key creators at Marvel such as Steve Gerber, Marv Wolfman, and others. In these new companies (Pacific, Eclipse, First) creators were free to create very personal stories. Mike Grell's Jon Sable Freelance, Howard Chaykin's American Flagg!, Mike Baron and Steve Rude's Nexus, Dave Steven's Rocketeer and John Ostrander's GrimJack attracted some attention and garnered a number of awards. These creators were brought in by DC editor Mike Gold to create defining works such as Green Arrow: The Longbow Hunters by Grell, Blackhawk by Chaykin, and Hawkworld by Truman. With Alan Moore, Frank Miller, and Art Spiegelman's Maus (which would later receive the Pulitzer Prize), this period marks the summit of the artform per comics expert Scott McCloud.

Fantasy and horror
The Comics Code Authority was established in 1954, and specified that no comic should contain the words "horror" or "terror" in its title. This led EC Comics to abandon its horror comics line. Publishers such as Dell and Gold Key Comics did run an expanding line of silver-age horror and "mystery" titles during the early 1960s, and Charlton maintained a continuous publishing history of them, during the later 1960s, a gradual loosening of enforcement standards eventually led to the re-establishment of horror titles within the DC and Marvel lineups by the end of the decade. Since this genre's evolution does not neatly match the hero-dominated transitional phases that are usually used to demarcate different eras of comic books, it is necessary to understand this "silver age" and "bronze age" background. 1970s horror anthology series merely continued what had already been established during the late 1960s, and endured into the 1980s until they were markedly transformed into new formats, many of which were greatly influenced by, or directly reprinted, "pre-code" content and styles of the early 1950s.

Starting with Alan Moore’s groundbreaking work on DC's Swamp Thing in the early 1980s, horror comic books incorporated elements of science fiction/fantasy and strove to a new artistic standard. Other examples include Neil Gaiman’s The Sandman (followed a few years later by Garth Ennis and Steve Dillon’s Preacher). DC's Vertigo line, under the editorship of Karen Berger, was launched in 1993, with the goal of specializing in this genre. Existing titles such as Animal Man, Doom Patrol, Hellblazer, and Shade, the Changing Man were absorbed into this new line. Other titles later were created for the line, which continued successfully into the 2010s.

Starting in the 1990s and throughout the 2000s, a number of successful movie adaptations of comic books, partly due to improvements in special effect technology, helped to extend their market audience, attracting the attention of many new readers who previously had not been interested in comic books. This also led to an avalanche of other comic book adaptations which included previously lesser known Vertigo titles, notably Constantine (based on the comic book Hellblazer) and V for Vendetta.

Rise of antiheroes
In the mid-1980s, Marvel antiheroes such as the X-Men's Wolverine, the Punisher, and writer/artist Frank Miller’s darker version of Daredevil challenged the previous model of the superhero as a cheerful humanitarian. Miller also created Elektra, who straddled the conventional boundary between love interest and villain.

Two artistically influential DC Comics limited series contributed to the trend: Batman: The Dark Knight Returns, also by Frank Miller and Watchmen by Alan Moore and Dave Gibbons, both of which were series of psychological depth that starred troubled heroes.

By the late 1980s DC had published many mature titles such as John Constantine, Hellblazer, Swamp Thing, and Lobo. They featured morally ambiguous characters such as the cynical John Constantine and the violence-loving Lobo with graphic violence and adult content that differentiated them from other mainstream titles. DC later separated these titles to their launched Vertigo imprint that publishes titles outside of the DC Universe.

By the early 1990s, antiheroes had become the rule rather than the exception, and among the most popular were Marvel Comics' Cable and Venom and Image Comics' Spawn.

The trend of creating characters with more psychological depth that were less black-and-white, also affected supervillains. For example, the Joker, Batman's nemesis, was portrayed less as an evil criminal and more as a mentally ill psychopath who cannot control his actions, Marvel Comics' galactic planet-eater Galactus became a force of nature who means no personal malice in his feedings, and the X-Men's nemesis Magneto became more benign and sympathetic as a man who fights for an oppressed people, albeit through means that others deem unacceptable.

Development of the X-Men franchise

By the mid-1980s, X-Men had become one of the most popular titles in comics. Marvel decided to build on this success by creating a number of spin-off titles, sometimes collectively referred to as "X-Books". These early X-Books included New Mutants (which would later become X-Force), X-Factor, Excalibur, and a Wolverine solo series. There were many new popular additions to the X-Men in the 1990s, including Cable and Bishop.

By the early 1990s, X-Men had become the biggest franchise in comics, and by the middle of the decade over a dozen X-Men-related comic books, both continuing and limited series, were published each month. On an almost annual basis from 1986 until 1999, one storyline crossed-over into almost every X-Book for two to three months. These "X-Overs" usually led to a spike in sales.

This sales boom resulted in a great deal of merchandising, such as action figures, video games, and trading cards. This success was thanks in no small part to the Fox Network's animated X-Men series, which debuted in 1992 and drew in a large number of younger fans.

The sales boom began to wane in the mid to late 1990s, due to the crash of the speculators' market and the effect it had on the industry. Marvel declared bankruptcy in 1996, and as a result, scaled back all of their franchises, including X-Men. A number of "X-books" were canceled, and the amount of limited series published, as well as general merchandise, was reduced.

In the early 2000s, a series of blockbuster X-Men films have kept the X-Men franchise healthy, and have resulted in a larger market presence outside of comics. In 1999–2000, a new animated series, X-Men: Evolution debuted, while new toys have been developed and sold since the success of the first X-Men feature film. The comic books themselves have been reinvented in series such as Grant Morrison's New X-Men and the Ultimate X-Men, which, like Marvel's other "Ultimate" series, is an alternative universe story, starting the X-Men tale anew. This was done for X-Men, and other books, because Marvel feared that the long and complex histories of the established storylines of certain titles were scaring off new readers.

Effect on other comics
Many series tried to imitate the model the X-Men carved as a franchise. Marvel and DC expanded popular properties, such as Punisher, Spider-Man, Batman, and Superman into networks of spin-off books in the mid-to-late 1980s. Like the X-Books, some of these spin-offs highlighted a concept or supporting character(s) from a parent series, while others were simply additional monthly series featuring a popular character. In another similarity to the X-Books, these franchises regularly featured crossovers, in which one storyline overlapped into every title in the “family” for a few months.

With regards to storylines overlapping, the Superman stories from 1991 to 2000 were written on a weekly basis. One needed to buy Superman, Adventures of Superman, Action Comics, and Superman: The Man of Steel (and eventually, Superman: The Man of Tomorrow) to keep up with any existing storylines. If a collector only bought Action Comics, they would only get twenty-five percent of the story. A triangle was featured on the cover of every Superman title with a number on it. This number indicated which week of the year the Superman title was released.

Makeovers and universe reboots

Complementing the creation of these franchises was the concept of redesigning the characters. The Modern Age of comics would usher in this era of change. The impact of Crisis on Infinite Earths was the first example as Supergirl died in issue 7, and long-time Flash (Barry Allen) died in issue 8. Specifically, Barry Allen signified the beginning of the Silver Age of Comics and his death was highly shocking at the time. Marvel Comics' Secret Wars would usher in a new change as well as Spider-Man would wear a black costume. This costume change led to the development of the character Venom.

The interest in the speculator market of a new Spider-Man costume led to other changes for Marvel characters in the 1980s. Iron Man would have a silver and red armor in issue 200. Captain America would be fired and would be reborn as the Captain, wearing a black outfit in issue 337 of the series. The Incredible Hulk would revert to his original grey skin color in issue 325. Issue 300 of the first Avengers series resulted in a new lineup including Mister Fantastic and the Invisible Woman, of the Fantastic Four. Within the decade, Wolverine would switch to a brown and yellow costume, Thor would be replaced by Thunderstrike, Archangel would emerge as the X-Men's Angel's dark counterpart after serving as one of Apocalypse's Horsemen, and many other Marvel characters would have complete image overhauls. The changes to Spider-Man, Thor, Captain America, Iron Man, Wolverine and most other Marvel characters would be undone in the early 1990s.

The 1990s would bring similar changes to the DC Universe, including the death of Superman and the crippling of Bruce Wayne in 1993. The only lasting change was Kyle Rayner replacing Hal Jordan as Green Lantern.

In addition to individual character or franchise/family wide makeovers, Crisis on Infinite Earths ushered in a popular trend of "rebooting", "remaking" or greatly reimagining the publisher-wide universes every 5–10 years on varying scales. The practise of rebooting entire universes occurred frequently enough that this era has also been referred to as The Booty Age. This often resulted in origins being retold, histories being rewritten, and so forth. These reinventions could be on as large a scale as suddenly retconning seminal story points and rewriting character histories, or simply introducing and/or killing off/writing out various important and minor elements of a universe. Crisis on Infinite Earths resulted in several miniseries which explicitly retconned character histories, such as Batman: Year One, Superman: Man of Steel and Wonder Woman: Gods and Mortals. An example of a less ambitious scale of changes is Green Arrow: The Longbow Hunters, which did not explicitly retcon or retell Green Arrow's history, but simply changed his setting and other elements of the present, leaving the past largely intact. This trend of publisher wide reinventions, which often consists of a new miniseries and various spinoff storylines in established books, continued for decades, with DC's New 52 in 2011 and Marvel's Secret Wars in 2015.

Image Comics and creator rights disputes

In the mid-1980s, artist Jack Kirby, co-creator of many of Marvel's most popular characters, came into dispute with Marvel over the disappearance of original pages of artwork from some of his most famous titles. Alan Moore, Frank Miller, and many other contemporary stars became vocal advocates for Kirby.

By the early 1990s, these events, as well as the influence of vocal proponents of independent publishing, helped to inspire a number of Marvel artists to form their own company, Image Comics, which would serve as a prominent example of creator-owned comics publishing. Marvel artists such as X-Men’s Jim Lee, The New Mutants/X-Force’s Rob Liefeld and Spider-Man’s Todd McFarlane were extremely popular and were idolized by younger readers in ways more common to professional athletes and rock musicians than comic book artists. Propelled by star power and upset that they did not own the popular characters they created for Marvel, several illustrators, including the above three formed Image Comics in 1992, an umbrella label under which several autonomous, creator-owned companies existed. Image properties, such as WildC.A.T.s, Gen¹³, Witchblade, and especially McFarlane’s Spawn provided brisk competition for long-standing superheroes. Image in particular is singled out by some critics for contributing to the conditions which led to the speculator market crashing, as Image titles favored alternative covers, foil covers, and other "collectible" comics.

Many popular creators followed Image's lead and attempted to use their star power to launch their own series; ones for which they would have licensing rights and editorial control. Chris Claremont, famous for his long run as the writer of Uncanny X-Men, created Sovereign Seven for DC; Joe Madureira, also made popular by Uncanny X-Men, launched Battle Chasers for WildStorm Productions; and Kurt Busiek, Alex Ross, and Brent Anderson created Astro City for Image.

Milestone Comics and ethnic diversity

In 1993, a coalition of African-American writers and artists started Milestone Comics, believing that minority characters were underrepresented in American superhero comics. Some of the company's better-known series include Static, about an African-American teen who became Milestone's key character, Hardware, an example of Afrofuturism, Icon, about an alien mimicking the appearance of an African-American, and Blood Syndicate, a series about a multicultural gang of superheroes. All of these flagship titles were co-created by Dwayne McDuffie. In 1997, the Milestone Universe merged with the DC Universe.

Rise and fall of the speculator market

By the late 1980s, important comic books, such as the first appearance of a classic character or first issue of a long-running series, were sold for thousands of dollars. Mainstream newspapers ran reports that comic books were good financial investments and soon collectors were buying massive amounts of comics they thought would be valuable in the future.

Publishers responded by manufacturing collectors’ items, such as trading cards, and “limited editions” of certain issues featuring a special or variant cover. The first issues of Marvel Comics' X-Force, X-Men vol. 2, and Spider-Man became some of the first and most notorious examples of this trend. Another trend which emerged was foil-stamped covers. The first Marvel comic book with a foil-stamped cover was the third volume of the Silver Surfer, issue 50 (June 1991). A glow-in-the-dark cover for Ghost Rider, volume 3, issue 15 appeared as well. This led a market boom, where retail shops and publishers made huge profits and many companies, large and small, expanded their lines. Image Comics in particular became notorious for this, with many of its series debuting with alternative covers, wide use of embossed and foil covers and other "collectible" traits.

This trend was not confined to the books themselves, and many other pieces of merchandise, such as toys, particularly "chase" action figures (figures made in smaller runs than others in a particular line), trading cards, and other items, were also expected to appreciate in value. McFarlane Toys was notable for this, as it created many variations in its high-quality toys, most of which were main characters or occasional guest stars in the Spawn series.

But few, in the glut of new series, possessed lasting artistic quality and the items that were predicted to be valuable did not become so, often because of huge print runs that made them commonplace. The speculator market began to collapse in summer 1993 after Turok #1 (sold without cover enhancements) badly underperformed and Superman's return in Adventures of Superman #500 sold less than his death in Superman #75, something speculators and retailers had not expected. Companies began expecting a contraction and Marvel UK's sales director, Lou Marks, stated in September 29 that retailers were saying there was "simply no room to display all the comics being produced". The resulting crash devastated the industry: sales plummeted, hundreds of retail stores closed and many publishers downsized. Marvel made an ill-judged decision during the crash to buy Heroes World Distribution to use as its own exclusive distributor, which resulted in both distribution problems for Marvel and the industry's other major publishers making exclusive distribution deals with other companies, which would lead to Diamond Comic Distributors Inc. becoming the only distributor of note in North America. In 1996, Marvel Comics, the largest company in the industry and hugely profitable just three years before, declared bankruptcy.

The crash also marked the relative downfall of the large franchises, inter-connected "families" of titles that lead to a glut of merchandising. While the big franchise titles still have a large amount of regular titles and merchandising attached to them, all of these things were notably scaled back after the crash.

Rise of the trade paperback format

Although sales of individual comic periodicals dropped in the late 1990s and the early 2000s, sales rose for trade paperbacks, collected editions in which several issues are bound together with a spine and often sold in bookstores as well as comic shops. Comic book publishers began releasing trade paperbacks of collected story arcs directly after those stories' original periodical publication, because a new reader could purchase the trade paperbacks and access the entire series' stories to date. The Librarian's Guide to Graphic Novels for Children and Tweens by David S. Serchay explains: "At first it was the most popular stories that were being collected, but more and more comic book stories are now being put into trade, sometimes less than two months after the 'newest' issue is sold. And [...] not only recent material but a great deal of older material is finally being collected into trades". In 2015, Polygon highlighted that "though this was far less common a decade ago, pretty much every monthly comic out there right now is eventually collected into trade paperback or hardcover edition that prints several issues in one package". Trade paperbacks are often even given volume numbers, making them a serialization of sorts. Due to this, many writers now consider their plots with the trade paperback edition in mind, scripting stories that last four to twelve issues, which could easily be read as a "graphic novel."

In addition, the publishing format has gained such respectability as literature that it became an increasingly prominent part of both book stores and public library collections. Trade paperbacks and graphic novels are the preferred format for circulating library collections, since these collections are created to be read, and not to be retained as collector's items or as investments. Attempts to catalogue and circulate single-issue comics can pose difficult problems and the durability of the trade paperback format is an important consideration for longevity and collection development in public and school libraries. Trade paperbacks "are also the primary culprit in people's confusion of the lexicon, since 'TPBs make up 95% of what many librarians refer to as graphic novels'".

Despite the growing popularity of the trade paperback, the serialized, individual issues are still considered the primary mode of sale by comics publishers, and a poorly selling series may face cancellation irrespective of trade paperback sales. However, some series "survive on the popularity of their trades sales, not just in the direct market and local comic shops, but in book stores across the world" and at "Scholastic [book] fairs and the like".

The popularity of trade paperbacks has resulted in older material being reprinted as well. The Essential Marvel line of trade paperbacks has reprinted heroes such as Spider-Man and the Fantastic Four and has been able to introduce these Silver Age stories to a new generation of fans. These editions tend to resemble a phone book in that these are very thick books and are black-and-white (to help keep the cost down). DC Comics has followed suit by introducing a line called Showcase Presents. The first four have included Superman, Green Lantern, Jonah Hex, and Metamorpho the Elemental Man. Other characters have included Green Arrow, the Superman Family, the Teen Titans and the Elongated Man.

In 2018, Screen Rant highlighted, "publishers and retailers traditionally ignore the sales of trade paperbacks when it comes to deciding whether or not a specific title is doing well. For decades, the single issue has been king, even though those sales figures are far from helpful. [...] Trade paperbacks are increasingly important as a marker of what sells, with 2016 seeing a 12% jump in trade sales over 2015 - a period when single issue sales fell. Even 2017, which saw both trades and single issue sales fall compared to 2016, trades were down 9.38%, compared to single issues dropping 10.4%". In 2019, Bleeding Cool emphasized, "in recent years, collected issues/trade paperbacks are more popular and profitable than monthly comic book periodicals. As single issue sales have consistently plummeted, trade paperbacks and graphic novels have filled in the gaps. From 2013 to 2018, graphic novels were the highest-selling format for comic books". According to industry reports, "the massive shift to graphic novels as the preferred format for comics continued in 2019 bringing sales in the book channel above the comic store channel in North America for the first time in the history of the medium" and that "the sales of graphic novels were growing faster in the book trade than in comics shops".

Comics creators' mainstream success

While many comic book artists and writers had become well known by their readership as early as the 1940s, some comics creators in the late 1980s and the 1990s became known to the general population. These included Todd McFarlane, Neil Gaiman, Alan Moore, and Frank Miller. Some, such as Gaiman, went on to write critically and commercially successful novels. Others, like Miller, became Hollywood screenwriters and directors.

Conversely, film and TV directors and producers became involved with comics. J. Michael Straczynski, creator of TV's Babylon 5, was recruited to write Marvel Comics' The Amazing Spider-Man and, later Fantastic Four filmmaker Reginald Hudlin became the writer of Marvel's Black Panther. Joss Whedon, creator of TV's Buffy the Vampire Slayer, wrote Marvel's Astonishing X-Men and Runaways, among other series. Richard Donner, who directed the Superman films of the 1970s and 1980s, became a writer on the Superman feature in Action Comics in 2006, co-writing with comics writer (and Donner's former production assistant) Geoff Johns. Paul Dini, producer and writer of Batman: The Animated Series and Superman: The Animated Series, started writing for DC in 1994 on special projects and took the helm as writer of Detective Comics in 2006.

Comics writer Peter David's career as a novelist developed concurrently with his comic book career. Sandman writer Neil Gaiman has also enjoyed success as a fantasy writer and number one New York Times Bestseller. Michael Chabon who won the Pulitzer Prize with The Amazing Adventures of Kavalier and Clay, a novel about the start of the Golden Age of Comic Books, then went on to write comics for DC and Dark Horse. Novelist Brad Meltzer saw success in the comics field with the controversial miniseries Identity Crisis, as well as runs on Green Arrow and Justice League of America.

Influence of other countries, genres, media and markets
The mid to late 1980s would see the quiet introduction of various translated Japanese manga into North America. While not the first company to release translated manga, the first company to do so to a large degree was Eclipse which introduced Area 88, Legend of Kamui, and Mai the Psychic Girl, the three titles that are generally associated with the first wave of manga translated into English. Along with Comico and Eternity Comics's adaptation of the Robotech animated series, various other companies would release manga style comics such as Ben Dunn's Ninja High School and Barry Blair's Samurai. Dark Horse Comics would release many translated manga during the 1990s. Marvel's Epic Comics line would also license an English translation of Katsuhiro Otomo's Akira. As of the 2010s, most translated manga are distributed by subsidiaries of the original Japanese property owners, such as Kodansha USA or Viz Media (subsidiary of Hitotsubashi Group). While manga translations were previously presented in the traditional American comic magazine format, the digest size publications traditional to manga has become common. In most cases, the books are presented in the original form intended to be read from right to left. Tokyopop was the first company to contract non-Japanese artists to produce and market (Original English-language manga). OELs are original material written by non-Japanese authors who directly emulate manga style in both storytelling and art and openly identify their works as manga. Previous manga-style comics consisted mostly of selective borrowing of manga or anime elements for a work that nevertheless is not intended to be regarded as manga.

In October 2019 industry analyst Milton Griepp presented data at an ICv2 conference in New York showing that for the first time in decades, the market was dominated not by traditionally American monthly comics of the superhero genre, but graphic novels and trade paperbacks of other genres, particular those aimed at younger readers, such Dav Pilkey’s Dog Man and Raina Telgemeier’s Guts, and Japanese manga and manga-inspired books. These books see high sales in book stores, though the shift was also reflected in comics shops. According to data by Bookscan, child-oriented comics and graphic novels accounted for a 41% of sell-through at bookstores, and manga is 28%, while books of the superhero genre constituted less than 10%, a drop of 9.6% year-over-year.

See also
 Events from the Modern Age of Comic Books
 Portrayal of women in American comics

References

Sources
 

1985 comics debuts
1985 establishments in the United States
 
1980s in the United States
1990s in the United States
2000s in the United States
2010s in the United States
2020s in the United States